João Pedro Mendes Santos (born 3 September 1999), known as João Pedro, is a Brazilian footballer who plays for Vitória. Mainly a defensive midfielder, he can also play as a central defender.

Club career
Born in Diadema, São Paulo, João Pedro began his career with São Paulo in 2009, aged ten. Five years later, he moved to Red Bull Brasil, and subsequently represented Água Santa and Santo André as a youth.

João Pedro made his senior debut with Santo André on 13 September 2019, starting in a 2–0 Copa Paulista home win over Inter de Limeira. In June 2020, he moved to Portuguesa Santista, and scored his first goal on 11 November of that year by netting the opener in a 1–2 loss at São Bernardo.

On 15 February 2021, João Pedro was loaned to Série B side Vitória, with a buyout clause. He made his club debut two days later, starting in a 3–3 Campeonato Baiano away draw against UNIRB.

On 2 December 2021, despite suffering team relegation, Vitória exercised the buyout clause on João Pedro's contract, and he signed a contract with the club until 2024.

Career statistics

References

1999 births
Living people
Footballers from São Paulo (state)
Brazilian footballers
Association football midfielders
Campeonato Brasileiro Série B players
Esporte Clube Santo André players
Associação Atlética Portuguesa (Santos) players
Esporte Clube Vitória players
People from Diadema